Magnetite Bluff is a bluff  northeast of Mount Stephens on the west side of Saratoga Table, in the Forrestal Range of Antarctica. It was named by the Advisory Committee on Antarctic Names in 1979, at the suggestion of Arthur B. Ford and following United States Geological Survey geological work in the area, from the extensive occurrences of magnetite in the gabbro of this area, which cause large magnetic anomalies over the Forrestal Range.

References

Cliffs of Queen Elizabeth Land